Paul Arma (Hungarian: Arma Pál, aka Amrusz Pál; né Weisshaus Imre; 22 November 1905, in Budapest – 28 November 1987, in Paris) was a Hungarian-French pianist, composer, and ethnomusicologist.

Arma studied under Béla Bartók from 1920 to 1924 at the Franz Liszt Academy of Music, after which time he toured Europe and America giving concerts and piano recitals. Béla Bartók influenced Arma in his love for folksong and collection. He left Hungary in 1930, eventually settling in Paris in 1933, where he became the piano soloist with Radio Paris. His music is generally characterised by modernist tendencies, although his varied output includes folk song arrangements, film music, popular and patriotic songs, in addition to solo, chamber, orchestral and electronic music.

Selected works 
 Chants du Silence for voice and piano (1942–44)
 Concerto for string quartet and orchestra (1947)
 Violin Sonata (1949)
 31 Instantanés for woodwinds, percussion, celesta, xylophone and piano (1951)
 Cantate de la Terre (1952)
 Improvisation, Précédée et Suivie de ses Variations for orchestra and tape (1954)
 Sept Variations Spatiophoniques for tape (1960)
 Chant du Marsouin for solo cello (1961)
 Polydiaphonie for orchestra (1962)
 Structures variées for orchestra (1964)
 Prismes sonores for orchestra (1966)
 Petite Suite for clarinet solo (1967)
 Six Transparences for oboe and string orchestra (1968)
 Résonances for orchestra (1971)
 Deux Résonances for percussion and piano (1972)
 Onze Convergences for string orchestra (1974)
 Six Évolutions for 4 flutes (1975)
 Six Convergences for orchestra (1978)
 Silences and Emergences for string quartet (1979)
 À la Mémoire de Béla Bartók for string orchestra and percussion (1980)
 Deux Regards for violin and piano (1982)
 Deux Images for cello and piano (1982)

References

External links 
 Arma Pál biography 

Hungarian classical pianists
Male classical pianists
Hungarian classical composers
Hungarian ethnomusicologists
Musicians from Budapest
1905 births
1987 deaths
20th-century classical pianists
20th-century classical composers
Pupils of Béla Bartók
Hungarian male classical composers
20th-century musicologists
20th-century Hungarian male musicians
Hungarian emigrants to France